Johan Settergren (born 22 April 1978) is a former professional tennis player from Sweden.

Settergren, who is from Halmstad, performed well in the juniors events at the 1996 Australian Open. A quarter-finalist in the boys' singles, he also reached the boys' doubles semi-finals with Per Thornadsson and en route beat the Bryan brothers as well as Lleyton Hewitt and his partner. The following year he turned professional.

In 2001, he made his first main draw appearances at ATP Tour level, in the singles at tournaments in Copenhagen and Bastad. He also played at the 2002 Mercedes Cup in Stuttgart and the 2004 If Stockholm Open. His only doubles appearance on the ATP Tour was at Stockholm in 2004. He and partner Robin Söderling accounted for fourth seeds Martín García and Sebastián Prieto in the first round, but had to concede a walkover in their next match. He won two Challenger titles, both in doubles, the first at Grenoble in 2001 when he defeated Ivan Ljubičić in the final. His Challenger career also included wins over Mikhail Youzhny, Paradorn Srichaphan, Mario Ančić, Nikolay Davydenko and most notably Novak Djokovic, at a qualifier in Sarajevo. He retired at the end of the 2005 season.

ATP Challenger and ITF Futures finals

Singles: 21 (14–7)

Doubles: 10 (6–4)

References

External links
 
 

1978 births
Living people
Swedish male tennis players
Sportspeople from Halmstad
Sportspeople from Halland County
20th-century Swedish people
21st-century Swedish people